Pseudomugil ivantsoffi is a species of blue-eye from the subfamily Pseudomugilinae, part of the rainbowfish family Melanotaeniidae. It is endemic to Western Papua in Indonesia.

Etymology
They named the species in honour of the ichthyologist Walter Ivantsoff of Macquarie University in Sydney.

References

Taxa named by Gerald R. Allen
Taxa named by Samuel Jafet Renyaan
Fish described in 1989
ivantsoffi